Ruleville is a city in Sunflower County, Mississippi, United States, in the Mississippi Delta region. The population was 3,007 at the 2010 census. It is the second-largest community in the rural county.

History
Ruleville was described as "surrounded by a fine fertile country and timber lands".  Development of the settlement followed construction of the Yazoo and Mississippi Valley Railroad, which established a stop here. The village was laid out in 1898 by J. W. Rule, for whom it was named. In September 1899 the official petition to Governor Anselm J. McLaurin to incorporate contained 98 names of the 'citizens and electors of Sunflower County...[who] reside in the village' noting that 150 people currently lived inside the village.

The rural area was being developed for cotton plantations after the American Civil War. Ruleville was established as an important cotton shipping point on the railroad. By the early 1900s, Ruleville had telephone and telegraph facilities, about 20 businesses, two white churches and one black church, a water works system, an electric light plant, three public gins, and excellent public schools for the white population.  The population in 1900 was 336. The Bank of Ruleville was established in 1903.

During the Civil Rights Movement that expanded beginning in the 1950s, Fannie Lou Hamer, a farm worker, started a movement for poor people.

Geography

Ruleville is along U.S. Route 49W.

Demographics

2020 census

As of the 2020 United States Census, there were 2,642 people, 986 households, and 521 families residing in the city.

2010 census
As of the 2010 United States Census, there were 3,007 people living in the city. The racial makeup of the city was 85.3% black, 12.8% white, 0.1% Native American, 0.1% Asian, 0.3% Pacific Islander, 0.1% from some other race and 0.5% from two or more races. 0.7% were Hispanic or Latino of any race.

2000 census
As of the census of 2000, there were 3,234 people, 1,020 households, and 774 families living in the city. The population density was 1,278.3 people per square mile (493.5/km). There were 1,096 housing units at an average density of 433.2 per square mile (167.3/km). The racial makeup of the city was 80.77% black, 18.65% white, 0.43% Asian, 0.06% Native American, 0.03% from other races, and 0.06% from two or more races. Hispanic or Latino of any race were 0.87% of the population.

There were 1,020 households, out of which 36.6% had children under the age of 18 living with them, 35.5% were married couples living together, 34.6% had a female householder with no husband present, and 24.1% were non-families. 21.4% of all households were made up of individuals, and 11.7% had someone living alone who was 65 years of age or older. The average household size was 3.03 and the average family size was 3.55.

In the city, the population was spread out, with 31.3% under the age of 18, 11.2% from 18 to 24, 23.0% from 25 to 44, 19.2% from 45 to 64, and 15.3% who were 65 years of age or older. The median age was 31 years. For every 100 females, there were 80.7 males. For every 100 females age 18 and over, there were 71.5 males.

The median income for a household in the city was $21,351, and the median income for a family was $23,036. Males had a median income of $25,104 versus $21,063 for females. The per capita income for the city was $11,664. About 29.5% of families and 36.0% of the population were below the poverty line, including 47.7% of those under age 18 and 27.4% of those age 65 or over.

Education
The City of Ruleville is served by the Sunflower County Consolidated School District. Schools serving Ruleville and in Ruleville include Ruleville Central Elementary School, Ruleville Middle School, and Thomas E. Edwards, Sr. High School (formerly Ruleville Central High School).

The school originated as a segregation academy, founded to evade orders to integrate the public schools.

Delta State University is located ten miles away in Cleveland.

During the Civil Rights Movement, 1964 was Freedom Summer, organizing for voter registration and education, and adding to the curriculum in the local segregated schools for blacks. The "Ruleville Freedom School" was established to try to provide an alternative to the second-class education that had been provided to black students. It tried to prepare students to be part of change and a democratic society, to prepare for the civil freedom that the movement supported and would press the political system to provide.

The Sunflower County Library operates the Horace Stansel Memorial Library in Ruleville.

Infrastructure

Transportation
Ruleville-Drew Airport is in unincorporated Sunflower County, between Ruleville and Drew. The airport is jointly operated by the cities of Ruleville and Drew.

Hotel
Ruleville Inn Motel

Healthcare
The North Sunflower Medical Center is a rural critical access hospital located in Ruleville, with 95 beds and approximately 500 employees. The medical center includes a surgical center, sleep center and outpatient rehabilitation unit.  The center partners with other facilities to provide specialty care, including the University of Mississippi Medical Center's Diabetes Telehealth Network and Mississippi Sports Medicine Center.

Notable people

 Lester Brinkley, American football player
 Robert Crook, Mississippi politician and lawyer
 Fannie Lou Hamer, civil rights leader
 Jimmy Rogers, Blues singer and musician
 Horace Stansel, civil engineer

References

Further reading
 

Larson, Kate Clifford    "Walk With Me, a biography of Fannie Lou Hamer"  Oxford University Press  2021

External links

 Ruleville Central Elementary School
 Ruleville Middle School

Cities in Mississippi
Cities in Sunflower County, Mississippi